Walker Station is a historic building located in Walker, Iowa, United States.  The two-story frame building with bracketed eaves was completed in 1873 along the Burlington, Cedar Rapids, and Minnesota Railway tracks.  The depot also served its successor railroads: the Burlington, Cedar Rapids and Northern, and the Chicago, Rock Island and Pacific.  Typical of many railroad towns in the Midwest, this is the first building that was built here and the town grew up around it.  It is an example of a combination depot that was used for both passenger and freight usage in smaller communities.  Because it has a ground level brick platform, service here was primary passenger and light freight service.  A higher level of freight service would have required a raised platform.

The station was closed in 1976 and later turned into a museum. It was listed on the National Register of Historic Places in 1978.

References

Railway stations in the United States opened in 1873
Walker
National Register of Historic Places in Linn County, Iowa
Railway stations on the National Register of Historic Places in Iowa
Former railway stations in Iowa
Transportation buildings and structures in Linn County, Iowa
1873 establishments in Iowa